This is a recap of the 1998 season for the Professional Bowlers Association (PBA) Tour.  It was the tour's 40th season, and consisted of 26 events.

Walter Ray Williams, Jr. joined Earl Anthony and Mark Roth as the only PBA players to win three consecutive PBA Player of the Year awards. Williams won five titles on the season, including a victory at the BPAA U.S. Open. The POY award was his fifth overall, one behind Anthony's record of six.  

Pete Weber captured his fifth major title and second PBA National Championship of his career. Bryan Goebel won the Brunswick World Tournament of Champions for his first major title.

For the first time, the ABC Masters was recognized as an official stop on the PBA Tour. Parker Bohn III shot the PBA's 12th televised 300 game in the opening match of the championship round, but it was Mike Aulby who won the event. It was Aulby's third ABC Masters title, and 26th PBA title.

Tournament schedule

References

External links
1998 Season Schedule

Professional Bowlers Association seasons
1998 in bowling